Álvaro Muñiz Cegarra (born 7 September 1988) is a Spanish professional footballer who plays for Spanish club Langreo, as a midfielder.

References

1988 births
Living people
Spanish footballers
Association football midfielders
Segunda División B players
Tercera División players
Caravaca CF players
CF La Unión players
Burgos CF footballers
Mar Menor FC players
Marino de Luanco footballers
Lorca FC players
Pontevedra CF footballers
CD Lealtad players
SD Formentera players
UD Ibiza players
Internacional de Madrid players
UP Langreo footballers
Veikkausliiga players
FC Inter Turku players
Spanish expatriate footballers
Spanish expatriate sportspeople in Finland
Expatriate footballers in Finland